Melanophylla aucubifolia is a species of plant in the Torricelliaceae family. It is endemic to Madagascar.  Its natural habitat is subtropical or tropical moist lowland forests. It is threatened by habitat loss.

References

Endemic flora of Madagascar
aucubifolia
Near threatened plants
Taxonomy articles created by Polbot